The 2019 ATP Challenger China International – Nanchang was a professional tennis tournament played on hard courts. It was the fifth edition of the tournament which was part of the 2019 ATP Challenger Tour. It took place in Nanchang, China between 22 and 28 April 2019.

Singles main-draw entrants

Seeds

 1 Rankings are as of 15 April 2019.

Other entrants
The following players received wildcards into the singles main draw:
  Cui Jie
  Gao Xin
  He Yecong
  Sun Fajing
  Te Rigele

The following players received entry into the singles main draw as alternates:
  Ben Patael
  Vishnu Vardhan

The following players received entry into the singles main draw using their ITF World Tennis Ranking:
  Bai Yan
  Teymuraz Gabashvili
  Jacob Grills
  Rio Noguchi

The following players received entry from the qualifying draw:
  Luca Margaroli
  Wu Hao

Champions

Singles

 Andrej Martin def.  Jordan Thompson 6–4, 1–6, 6–3.

Doubles

 Sander Arends /  Tristan-Samuel Weissborn def.  Alex Bolt /  Akira Santillan 6–2, 6–4.

References

2019 ATP Challenger Tour
2019
2019 in Chinese tennis
April 2019 sports events in China